Baranya or Baranja may refer to:

 Baranya (region) or Baranja, a region in Hungary and Croatia
 Baranya County, a county in modern Hungary
 Baranya County (former), a county in the historic Kingdom of Hungary
 Baranya, Hungarian name of  village in Zakarpattia Oblast, Ukraine
 Baranja, Nepal, a village in Nepal

See also
 Baranyai, a surname
 Baranjars, a group of medieval Turkic tribes
 Barania Góra, mountain in southern Poland